Thomas Pendergast , known as Thomas Pendergast (12 January 1870–1946) was an English footballer who played in the Football League for Accrington.

Season 1889-90
Thomas Pendergast made his club and League debut as a 19 year old on 19 October 1889. The match was played at Thorneyholme Road, Accrington and the visitors were Burnley. Pendergast played as a left-sided inside forward. The match ended 2-2. He played 16 of Accrington' 22 League fixtures, all at Inside-Forward and he scored six goals in the season. The Lancashire Evening Post of 20 November 1889 made reference to Pendergast's first club and League goal which put Accrington 1-0 up. "Directly afterwards, however, Pendergast drew first blood." The article also states that Pendergast had a shot saved by Jimmy Warner not long after he scored. During the first-half Villa had taken a 2-1 lead and it was Pendergast who put them back in front. "The Reds (Accrington) had a fruitless corner, but before long Pendergast scored with a simple shot. 

He later played for Accrington Stanley and was a director of that club for many years.

Statistics
Source:

References

1870 births
1946 deaths
English footballers
Accrington F.C. players
English Football League players
Association football forwards